O'Higgins Glacier is a glacier located in Bernardo O'Higgins National Park, Chile. It is one of the principal glaciers of the Southern Patagonian Ice Field. The summit of the active Lautaro volcano is the top of the accumulation zone of the glacier. The bulk of the glacier is part of the icefield plateau.

See also
Pío XI Glacier
List of glaciers

References

Glaciers of Aysén Region